Eudonia linealis is a species of moth in the family Crambidae. This species is endemic to New Zealand. It is classified as "Data Deficient" by the Department of Conservation.

Taxonomy 
It was originally described by Francis Walker in 1866 using a specimen collected in Nelson by T. R. Oxley and named Scoparia linealis. Hudson discussed this species in his 1928 publication The Butterflies and Moths of New Zealand as a synonym of Scoparia submarginalis. 1988 John S. Dugdale placed the species in the genus Eudonia. There is debate as to whether this species is recognised as the type specimen is lacking its abdomen. It has been hypothesized that the holotype of this species, held at the Natural History Museum, London, may be a worn specimen of Eudonia philerga.

Description 
Walker described the species as follows:

Distribution 
This species is endemic to New Zealand. The type specimen was collected in Nelson. This species has possibly been rediscovered at Canaan Downs on Takaka Hill by Ian Millar.

Conservation status 

This species has been classified as having the "Data Deficient" conservation status under the New Zealand Threat Classification System.

References

External links
Image of holotype specimen

Moths described in 1866
Eudonia
Endemic fauna of New Zealand
Moths of New Zealand
Taxa named by Francis Walker (entomologist)
Endemic moths of New Zealand